Cucudeta is a genus of Papuan jumping spiders that was first described by Wayne Paul Maddison in 2009.  it contains only three species, found only in Papua New Guinea: C. gahavisuka, C. uzet, and C. zabkai.

References

External links
 Videos of walking Cucudeta uzet

Arthropods of New Guinea
Salticidae
Salticidae genera
Spiders of Asia